The Yibna Bridge or Nahr Rubin Bridge is a Mamluk arch bridge near Yibna, which crosses the river Nahal Sorek (formerly known as Nahr Rubin, or Wadi al-Tahuna). It was previously used by Route 410 to Rehovot, and was known as the Jumping Bridge due to a bump in the middle of the bridge which caused cars to jump if speeding. It is now a part of a recreation ground, next to a new bridge carrying the Route 410.

History

The bridge was one in a series of bridges built by Sultan Baybars in Egypt and Palestine. It was first studied in modern times by Clermont-Ganneau, who noted that an Arabic chronicle had referred to the construction by Baybars in 672 AH of two bridges build of a significant nature "in the neighbourhood of Ramleh". The chief purpose of these bridges was to ease communication for his armies between Egypt and northern Syria. The second of these two bridges is thought to be the Jisr Jindas.

According to Clermont-Ganneau, the  bridge was built in 671–672 AH (1273–1274). The Archaeology of Society in the Holy Land cites the completion date as 1273.

Max van Berchem, who examined it in the late 19th century, found that the bridge contained large amount of reused Crusader masonry, some of which carried mason´s marks.

Description
It comprises three arches, two central piers with triangular upstream-facing cutwaters and downstream-facing buttresses with sloping cills. 

It is very similar in design to the more well-known Jisr Jindas, apart from the width of the piers. The bridge has a more than 2:1 arch-span to pier-width ratio versus approximately 1:1 at Jisr Jindas. 

The bridge does not contain any decoration or inscriptions, similar to that found on Jisr Jindas. However, according to Andrew Petersen there is "a possible inscription or signature" on a stone at the south end.

See also
Barid, Muslim postal network renewed during Mamluk period (roads, bridges, khans)
Jisr al-Ghajar, stone bridge south of Ghajar
Daughters of Jacob Bridge (Jisr Banat Yaqub), Mamluk bridge on the upper Jordan River
Al-Sinnabra Crusader bridge, with nearby Jisr Umm el-Qanatir/Jisr Semakh and Jisr es-Sidd further downstream
Jisr el-Majami bridge over the Jordan, with Mamluk khan
Jisr Jindas bridge over the Ayalon near Lydda and Ramla
Isdud Bridge (Mamluk, 13th century) outside Ashdod/Isdud
Jisr ed-Damiye, bridges over the Jordan (Roman, Mamluk, modern)

References

Bibliography

 

  
 
Petersen, A. (2010): Bridges in Medieval Palestine, in U. Vermeulen & K. Dhulster (eds.), History of Egypt & Syria in the Fatimid, Ayyubid & Mamluk Eras V, V. Peeters, Leuven

External links
Survey of Western Palestine, Map 13:  IAA, Wikimedia commons 

Bridges in Israel
Bridges completed in the 13th century
Mamluk architecture in Israel